Bad Essen is a small municipality and health resort in the district of Osnabrück, in Lower Saxony. Bad Essen with its historical centre is located on the German Timber-Frame Road.

Geography
The town of Bad Essen is on the North German Plains, because of the transition of the low mountain range to the plains. The Wiehengebirge Range covers approximately the southern third of the town and reaches an elevation of 211m above sea level. The highest point of the Wiehengebirge Range is on the black Brink in Lintorf. The northern part of the town is flat, with an average elevation of 50m above sea level. The Hunte flows through the eastern part of Bad Essen northwards and crosses the Midland Canal in Wittlage.

References

External links
 Official Webpage

 
Wiehen Hills
Osnabrück (district)
Spa towns in Germany